The Sabah Masters was a professional golf tournament that was held annually in Sabah, Malaysia.

History
First held in the 1982 as part of the Malaysian PGA circuit, the Sabah Masters has formed part of several higher level professional tours. After a sanctioning arrangement with the PGA Tour of Australasia fell through and resulted in no tournament in 1993, the Sabah Masters was an event on the Asia Golf Circuit schedule in 1994 and 1995 before switching to the then fledgling Asian PGA/Omega Tour between 1996 and 1999.

After the 1999 tournament, the Sabah Masters was not held again until 2011 when was revived as a fixture on the ASEAN PGA Tour; in 2014 it became the season ending tour championship, with the season promoted as the "Road to Sabah Masters". After a 20 year hiatus from the major tours, it returned as an event on the Asian Tour calendar in 2019.

Venues
Sabah Golf and Country Club played host to the Sabah Masters until 1998 when the Asian PGA decided to inaugurate a rotation policy, with Shan Shui Golf and Country Club hosting that year. Sutera Harbour Golf and Country hosted the tournament in 1999, and has remained as the venue for every renewal since then.

Winners

Notes

References

External links
Coverage on the Asian Tour's official site

Golf tournaments in Malaysia
Former Asian Tour events
Asia Golf Circuit events
Sport in Sabah
Recurring sporting events established in 1982